Wilberforce Paa Kwesi Ocran (born Kumasi, Ghana, 24 September 1999) is an English professional footballer who plays for Brentwood Town.

Club career
Prior a move to Charlton Athletic in May 2018, Ocran enjoyed spells at Watford, Arsenal, Leyton Orient, Enfield Town and Barnsley.  On 10 November 2018, Ocran joined Isthmian League South East Division side, Cray Wanderers and went onto feature three times, scoring once before returning to Charlton at the end of the month. 

On 13 August 2019, Ocran made his professional debut, replacing Sam Field in the 78th minute, during Charlton's  home 0–0 draw with Forest Green Rovers in an EFL Cup first round tie, in which the visitors eventually claimed the victory on penalties, 5–3. During the latter stages of the 2019–20, prior to the COVID-19 pandemic, Ocran joined Isthmian League North Division side, Brentwood Town where he featured twice, failing to score.  On 2 July 2020, it was confirmed that Ocran had left Charlton after his contract   expired.

Prior to the 2020–21 campaign, Ocran made a move to Southern League Premier Division South side, Farnborough  before returning to Brentwood Town  in October.

Personal life
Born in Ghana, Ocran grew up in north London .

Career statistics

References

1999 births
Living people
English footballers
English people of Ghanaian descent
Association football forwards
Watford F.C. players
Arsenal F.C. players
Enfield Town F.C. players
Barnsley F.C. players
Charlton Athletic F.C. players
Cray Wanderers F.C. players
Brentwood Town F.C. players
Farnborough F.C. players
Black British sportspeople